Singheshwar Assembly constituency is an assembly constituency in Madhepura district in the Indian state of Bihar. It is reserved for scheduled castes from 2010. Earlier, it was an open seat.

Overview
As per Delimitation of Parliamentary and Assembly constituencies Order, 2008, No. 72 Singheshwar Assembly constituency (SC) is composed of the following:
Singheshwar, Shankarpur and Kumarkhand community development blocks.

Singheshwar Assembly constituency is part of No. 8 Supaul (Lok Sabha constituency) from 2010. It was earlier part of Madhepura (Lok Sabha constituency).

Members of Legislative Assembly

Election results

2020

References

External links
 

Assembly constituencies of Bihar
Politics of Madhepura district